Berfin Şengül (born August 20, 2002) is a Turkish curler from Erzincan, Turkey. She currently plays lead on the Turkish National Women's Curling Team skipped by Dilşat Yıldız. She also skips the Turkish junior women's team.

Career
Şengül played third on the Turkish team that represented the nation at the 2020 Winter Youth Olympics in Champéry, Switzerland. Her team, with skip Selahattin Eser, fourth Kadir Polat and lead İfayet Şafak Çalıkuşu finished 2–3 through the round robin, not enough to advance to the playoff round. She then competed with Olle Moberg of Sweden in the mixed doubles event. The pair won their first game, before losing in the round of twenty-four, eliminating them from contention. In 2022, she was set to skip the Turkish junior women's team at the 2022 World Junior-B Curling Championships before the event was cancelled due to an outbreak of COVID-19 cases in the men's event. Şengül was added to the Turkish national women's team for the 2021–22 season.

The 2021–22 season was a breakout season for Turkish curling, as the nation found relative successful in the international events they attended. At the start of the season, Erzurum hosted the 2021 Pre-Olympic Qualification Event to qualify teams for the 2021 Olympic Qualification Event. In the women's event, the Turkish team succeeded in qualifying for the Olympic Qualification Event, going 5–1 through the round robin and knockout round. Their next event was the 2021 European Curling Championships, where Turkey competed in the A Division. Through the event, Turkey posted three victories against Denmark, Estonia and Italy, enough to finish in seventh place in the group. This seventh-place finish was enough to earn them a direct spot into the 2022 World Women's Curling Championship, the first time Turkey ever qualified for a men's or women's world championship. Next was the Olympic Qualification Event, held December 5 to 18 in Leeuwarden, Netherlands. Şengül, with teammates Dilşat Yıldız, Öznur Polat, Ayşe Gözütok and Mihriban Polat, finished 3–5 through the round robin. Their three victories, however, came against the top three teams in the event. The team defeated the eventual Olympic gold and silver medalists Eve Muirhead and Satsuki Fujisawa, as well as the silver medalists from 2018 in Korea's Kim Eun-jung. Into the new year, Şengül and the women's team represented Turkey at the World Championship. After losing multiple close games in extra ends, the Turkish team was able to record their first victory in World Women's Championship history against Czech Republic's Alžběta Baudyšová 7–5 in Draw 17 of the event. The team ultimately finished the event in eleventh place with a 2–10 record, recording their second victory against the Scottish team who had to withdraw before the event began.

Personal life
Şengül is employed as an athlete.

Teams

References

External links

Turkish female curlers
Living people
2002 births
People from Erzincan
Sportspeople from Erzurum
Curlers at the 2020 Winter Youth Olympics
21st-century Turkish women